Bregnano is a comune (municipality) in the Province of Como in the Italian region Lombardy, located about  northwest of Milan and about  south of Como.

Bregnano borders the following municipalities: Cadorago, Cermenate, Lazzate, Lomazzo, Rovellasca.

Churches in the town include San Michele, San Giorgio and Santi Ippolito e Cassiano.

References

Cities and towns in Lombardy